Indirana tysoni, also known by its common name Tyson's leaping frog is a species from the genus Indirana. The species was originally described in 2016 by Neelesh Dahanukar, Nikhil Modak, Keerthi Krutha, P. O. Nameer, Anand D. Padhye, and Sanjay Molur.

Range
Indirana tysoni has been observed in Kerala, India.

Etymology
The frog is named after Neil deGrasse Tyson to acknowledge his role in popularising and communicating science to the general public.

References

External links

tysoni
Taxa named by Neelesh Dahanukar
Animals described in 2016